Marine Fighting Squadron 472 (VMF-472) was a fighter squadron of the United States Marine Corps during World War II.  Known as “The Flying Seahorses”, the squadron flew the Grumman F6F Hellcat during its short time in existence.  The squadron was slated to support the invasion of Japan in late 1945 however the Japanese surrender meant it did not get further than Hawaii and did not participate in combat action during the war. VMF-472 was decommissioned on December 24, 1945 and no other Marine Corps squadron has carried its lineage and honors since.

History
Marine Fighting Squadron 472 was commissioned on June 1, 1944 at Marine Corps Air Station El Centro, California.  The squadron trained in the California desert for four months before being decommissioned on October 1, 1944 at Marine Corps Air Station El Toro.  After decommissioning the squadron's assets were redistributed to VMF-461.  VMF-472 was reactivated on March 1, 1945 at Marine Corps Air Station Mojave, CA, under the command of Marine Air Support Group 51 (MASG-51), this time tasked with training for operations on Navy escort carriers. This was part of a larger program to have eight Marine air groups trained and ready to operate from escort carriers in support of the invasion of Japan in late 1945.  In May 1945 the squadron was briefly re-designated at VMF(CVS)-472 however by June 1 it had reverted to its original moniker.

VMF-472 departed the West Coast of the United States in July 1945 reaching Marine Corps Air Station Ewa, Hawaii that same month. The squadron remained in Hawaii after the end of the war and was eventually decommissioned on December 24, 1945 at MCAS Ewa.

Commanding Officers
The following naval aviators served as commanding officers of VMF-472 during its existence: 
 
Lt Charles M. Jackson - June 1, 1944
Capt George C. Hays - June 2, 1944 - June 12, 1944
Maj John A. Reeder - June 13, 1944 - June 25, 1944
Maj Richard F. Harrison - June 26, 1944 - July 6, 1944
Maj Hamilton Lawrence - July 7, 1944 - October 1, 1944
Maj Robert L. Bryson - March 1, 1945 - Unknown

Unit awards

A unit citation or commendation is an award bestowed upon an organization for the action cited. Members of the unit who participated in said actions are allowed to wear on their uniforms the awarded unit citation. VMF-472 was presented with the following awards:

See also
 United States Marine Corps Aviation
 List of active United States Marine Corps aircraft squadrons
 List of decommissioned United States Marine Corps aircraft squadrons

Citations

References
Bibliography

 

Fighting472
Inactive units of the United States Marine Corps